Polinices is a genus of predatory sea snails, marine gastropod molluscs in the subfamily Polinicinae  of the family Naticidae, commonly known as moon snails.

Species
Species within the genus Polinices include:
 
 Polinices albumen (Linnaeus, 1758)
 Polinices alveatus (Troschel, 1852)
 Polinices amiculatus (Philippi, 1849)
 Polinices aurantius (Röding, 1798)
 Polinices bifasciatus (Griffith & Pidgeon, 1834)
 Polinices candidissimus (Le Guillou, 1842)
 † Polinices cerovaensis Harzhauser, 2011 
 † Polinices chattonensis (Marwick, 1924) 
 Polinices citrinus (Philippi, 1851)
 Polinices cleistopsila Barnard, 1963
 Polinices constanti Huelsken & Hollmann, 2012
 Polinices cora (d'Orbigny, 1840)
 Polinices cumingianus (Récluz, 1844)
 Polinices effusus (Swainson, 1840)
 † Polinices fallai (Fletcher, 1938) 
 Polinices flemingianus (Recluz, 1844)
 Polinices grunerianus (Philippi, 1852)
 Polinices hacketti Marincovich, 1975
 Polinices hepaticus (Röding, 1798) - brown moonsnail
 † Polinices huttoni Ihering, 1907 
 Polinices immaculatus (Totten, 1835)
 Polinices intemeratus (Philippi, 1853)
 † Polinices intracrassus Finlay, 1924 
 Polinices jukesii (Reeve, 1855)
 Polinices lacteus (Guilding, 1834) - milk moonsnail
 † Polinices laxus (Finlay, 1926) 
 Polinices leptaleus Watson, 1881
 Polinices limi Pilsbry, 1931
 † Polinices lobatus (Marwick, 1924) 
 † Polinices mackayi Marwick, 1931 
 Polinices mammilla (Linnaeus, 1758)
 Polinices mediopacificus Kosuge, 1979
 Polinices mellosus (Hedley, 1924)
 † Polinices mucronatus (Marwick, 1924) 
 † Polinices oneroaensis Powell & Bartrum, 1929 
 † Polinices otaioensis Marwick, 1960 
 Polinices otis G.B.  Broderip & Sowerby I, 1829
 Polinices paciae Bozzetti, 1997
 Polinices panamaensis (Récluz, 1844)
 † Polinices parki Finlay & Marwick, 1937 
 Polinices perspicuus (Récluz, 1850)
 Polinices peselephanti (Link, 1807)
 Polinices powisianus (Récluz, 1844)
 † Polinices propeovatus (Marwick, 1924) 
 Polinices psilus (Watson, 1886)
 Polinices putealis Garrard, 1961
  † Polinices redemptus (Michelotti, 1847)
 Polinices sagamiensis Pilsbry, 1904
 † Polinices sagenus Suter, 1917 
 Polinices tawhitirahia Powell, 1965
 Polinices uber (Valenciennes, 1832)
 Polinices uberinus (d'Orbigny, 1842) - dwarf white moonsnail, white moonsnail
 † Polinices unisulcatus (Marwick, 1924) 
 Polinices vavaosi (Reeve, 1855)
 Polinices vestitus Kuroda, 1961
 † Polinices waipaensis (Marwick, 1924) 
 † Polinices waipipiensis (Marwick, 1924) 

Species brought into synonymy
 Polinices agujanus Dall, 1908: synonym of Lunatia agujana (Dall, 1908)
 Polinices albus Montfort, 1810: synonym of Polinices mammilla (Linnaeus, 1758)
 Polinices alderi (Forbes, 1838): synonym of Euspira pulchella (Risso, 1826)
 Polinices aulacoglossa Pilsbry & Vanatta, 1909: synonym of Glossaulax aulacoglossa (Pilsbry & Vanatta, 1909)
 Polinices bahamensis (Dall, 1825): synonym of Sigatica semisulcata (Gray, 1839)
 Polinices bathyraphe Pilsbry, 1911: synonym of Sigatica bathyraphe (Pilsbry, 1911)
 Polinices blaesus Marwick, 1929 †: synonym of Polinella blaesa (Marwick, 1929) †
 Polinices blaizensis Kilburn, 1976: synonym of Euspira blaizensis (Kilburn, 1976) (original combination)
 Polinices caprae (Philippi, 1852): synonym of Mammilla caprae (Philippi, 1852)
 Polinices columnaris (Récluz, 1850): synonym of Polinices peselephanti (Link, 1807)
 Polinices conicus (Lamarck, 1822): synonym of Conuber conicum (Lamarck, 1822)
 Polinices creper Marwick, 1965 †: synonym of Polinella creper (Marwick, 1965) † (original combination)
 Polinices didyma (Röding, 1798): synonym of Neverita didyma (Röding, 1798)
 Polinices draconis (Dall, 1903): synonym of Glossaulax draconis (Dall, 1903)
 Polinices dubius (Récluz, 1844): synonym of Polinices constanti Huelsken & Hollmann, 2012
 Polinices duplicatus (Say, 1822): synonym of Neverita duplicata (Say, 1822)
 Polinices ephebus Hedley, 1915: synonym of Glossaulax epheba (Hedley, 1915)
 Polinices fibrosa (Souleyet, 1852): synonym of Mammilla fibrosa (Gray, 1850)
 Polinices fringillus (Dall, 1881): synonym of Euspira fringilla (Dall, 1881)
 Polinices fryei Laws, 1933 †: synonym of Polinella fryei (Laws, 1933) † (original combination)
 Polinices fuscus (Blainville, 1825): synonym of Lunatia fusca (Blainville, 1825)
 Polinices galapagosus (Récluz, 1844): synonym of Polinices otis (Broderip & G.B. Sowerby I, 1829)
 Polinices gradisuturalis Marwick, 1932 †: synonym of Polinella gradisuturalis (Marwick, 1932) †
 Polinices groenlandica [sic]: synonym of Polinices groenlandicus (Møller, 1842): synonym of Euspira pallida (Broderip & G. B. Sowerby I, 1829) (incorrect gender ending)
 Polinices groenlandicus (Møller, 1842): synonym of Euspira pallida (Broderip & G. B. Sowerby I, 1829)
 Polinices grossularia Marche-Marchad, 1957: synonym of Lunatia grossularia (Marche-Marchad, 1957)
 Polinices guilleminii (Payraudeau, 1826): synonym of Euspira guilleminii (Payraudeau, 1826)
 Polinices helicoides (Gray, 1825): synonym of Hypterita helicoides (Gray, 1825)
 Polinices heros Say, 1822: synonym of Euspira heros (Say, 1822)
 Polinices incei (Philippi, 1853): synonym of Conuber incei (Philippi, 1853)
 Polinices kurodai Iw. Taki, 1944: synonym of Mammilla kurodai (Iw. Taki, 1944)
 Polinices lewisii: synonym of Euspira lewisii (Gould, 1847)
 Polinices litorinus Dall, 1908: synonym of Lunatia litorina (Dall, 1908)
 Polinices macilenta (Philippi, 1844): synonym of Lunatia macilenta (Philippi, 1844)
 Polinices macrostoma (Philippi, 1852): synonym of Mammilla kurodai (Iw. Taki, 1944)
 Polinices mamilla [sic]: synonym of Polinices mammilla (Linnaeus, 1758)
 Polinices mammata [sic]: synonym of Polinices mammatus (Röding, 1798): synonym of Mammilla mammata (Röding, 1798) (incorrect gender ending)
 Polinices maurus (Lamarck, 1816): synonym of Mammilla maura (Lamarck, 1816)
 Polinices melanostoma (Gmelin, 1791): synonym of Mammilla melanostoma (Gmelin, 1791)
 Polinices motutaraensis Powell, 1935 †: synonym of Taniella motutaraensis (Powell, 1935) †
 Polinices nanus Möller, 1842: synonym of Pseudopolinices nanus (Möller, 1842)
 Polinices napus (E.A. Smith, 1904): synonym of Euspira napus (E.A. Smith, 1904)
 Polinices nubilus (Dall, 1889): synonym of Payraudeautia nubila (Dall, 1889)
 Polinices obtusa (Jeffreys, 1885): synonym of Neverita obtusa (Jeffreys, 1885)
 Polinices opaca [sic]: synonym of Polinices opacus (Récluz, 1851): synonym of Mammilla melanostoma (Gmelin, 1791) (incorrect gender ending)
 Polinices opacus (Récluz, 1851): synonym of Mammilla melanostoma (Gmelin, 1791)
 Polinices pallidus  (Broderip & Sowerby, 1829): synonym of Lunatia pallida (Broderip & G.B. Sowerby I, 1829)
 Polinices pardoanus Dall, 1908: synonym of Lunatia pardoana (Dall, 1908)
 Polinices parvulus Bozzetti, 2010: synonym of Notocochlis gualteriana (Récluz, 1844)
 Polinices patagonicus (Philippi, 1845): synonym of Falsilunatia patagonica (Philippi, 1845)
 Polinices pila Pilsbry, 1911: synonym of Lunatia pila (Pilsbry, 1911)
 Polinices planispirus Suter, 1917 †: synonym of Magnatica planispira (Suter, 1917) † (original combination)
 Polinices porcelanus (d'Orbigny, 1839): synonym of Polinices lacteus (Guilding, 1834)
 Polinices presubplicata Bouchet & Warén, 1993: synonym of Euspira presubplicata (Bouchet & Warén, 1993)
 Polinices priamus (Récluz, 1843): synonym of Mammilla priamus (Récluz, 1844)
 Polinices pseudovitreus Finlay, 1924 †: synonym of Uberella pseudovitrea (Finlay, 1924) †
 Polinices psila [sic]: synonym of Polinices psilus (R. B. Watson, 1886) (incorrect gender ending)
 Polinices pulchella (Risso, 1826): synonym of Euspira pulchella (Risso, 1826)
 Polinices pyriformis (Récluz, 1844): synonym of Polinices mammilla (Linnaeus, 1758)
 Polinices rapulum (Reeve, 1855): synonym of Polinices intemeratus (Philippi, 1853)
 Polinices ravidus (Souleyet, 1852): synonym of Polinices amiculatus (Philippi, 1849)
 Polinices reclusianus (Deshayes, 1839): synonym of Glossaulax reclusiana (Deshayes, 1839)
 Polinices recluzianus (Deshayes, 1839): synonym of Glossaulax reclusiana (Deshayes, 1839)
 Polinices sandwichensis Dall, 1895: synonym of Natica sandwichensis (Dall, 1895)
 Polinices sebae (Récluz, 1844): synonym of Mammilla sebae (Récluz, 1844)
 Polinices simiae (Deshayes, 1838): synonym of Mammilla simiae (Deshayes, 1838)
 Polinices sordidus (Swainson, 1821): synonym of Conuber sordidum (Swainson, 1821)
 Polinices stanleyi Marwick, 1948 †: synonym of Polinices waipipiensis (Marwick, 1924) † (synonym)
 Polinices subplicata (Jeffreys, 1885): synonym of Euspira subplicata (Jeffreys, 1885)
 Polinices tawhitirahia Powell, 1965: synonym of Polinices mellosum (Hedley, 1924)
 Polinices triseriata (Say, 1826): synonym of Lunatia triseriata (Say, 1826)
 Polinices tumidus (Swainson, 1840): synonym of Polinices mammilla (Linnaeus, 1758)
 Polinices unimaculatus (Reeve, 1855): synonym of Polinices otis (Broderip & G.B. Sowerby I, 1829)
 Polinices yokoyamai Kuroda & Habe, 1952: synonym of Euspira yokoyamai (Kuroda & Habe, 1952)
 Polinices zanzibarica Recluz, 1844: synonym of Mammilla sebae (Récluz, 1844)

References 

 
 Powell A. W. B. (1979), New Zealand Mollusca, William Collins Publishers Ltd, Auckland, New Zealand 
 Spencer, H.; Marshall. B. (2009). All Mollusca except Opisthobranchia. In: Gordon, D. (Ed.) (2009). New Zealand Inventory of Biodiversity. Volume One: Kingdom Animalia. 584 pp
 Torigoe K. & Inaba A. (2011) Revision on the classification of Recent Naticidae. Bulletin of the Nishinomiya Shell Museum 7: 133 + 15 pp., 4 pls.
 Ehrenberg, C. G. (1831). Symbolae physicae, seu, Icones et descriptiones corporum naturalium novorum aut minus cognitorum, quae ex itineribus per Libyam Aegyptum Nubiam Dongalam Syriam Arabiam et Habessiniam publico institutis sumptu Friderici Guilelmi Hemprich et Christiani Godofredi Ehrenberg, Animalia evertebrata, Animalia Mollusca. Zoologica. II: unpaginated [46 pages], plates 1-2. page(s): 46

External links 
 Montfort P. [Denys de]. (1808-1810). Conchyliologie systématique et classification méthodique des coquilles. Paris: Schoell. Vol. 1: pp. lxxxvii + 409
  Herrmannsen, A. N. (1846-1852). Indicis Generum Malacozoorum primordia. Fischer, Cassel. Vol. 1: i-xxviii, 1-637 pp.
 Röding, P.F. (1798). Museum Boltenianum sive Catalogus cimeliorum e tribus regnis naturæ quæ olim collegerat Joa. Fried Bolten, M. D. p. d. per XL. annos proto physicus Hamburgensis. Pars secunda continens Conchylia sive Testacea univalvia, bivalvia & multivalvia. Trapp, Hamburg. viii, 199 pp.
 Guilding L. (1834). Observations on Naticina and Dentalium, two genera of molluscous animals. Transactions of the Linnean Society of London. 17(1): 29-35
 Adams, H. & Adams, A. (1853-1858). The genera of Recent Mollusca; arranged according to their organization. London, van Voorst. Vol. 1: xl + 484 pp.; vol. 2: 661 pp.; vol. 3: 138 pls
 Huelsken T., Tapken D., Dahlmann T., Wägele H., Riginos C. & Hollmann M. (2012) Systematics and phylogenetic species delimitation within Polinices s.l. (Caenogastropoda: Naticidae) based on molecular data and shell morphology. Organisms, Diversity & Evolution 12: 349-375.

Naticidae
Extant Paleocene first appearances